"Where Have All the Flowers Gone?" is a folk song originally written by American singer-songwriter Pete Seeger in 1955.  Inspired lyrically by the traditional Cossack folk song "Koloda-Duda", Seeger borrowed an Irish melody for the music, and published the first three verses in Sing Out! magazine. Additional verses were added in May 1960 by Joe Hickerson, who turned it into a circular song.
Its rhetorical "where?" and meditation on death place the song in the ubi sunt tradition. In 2010, the New Statesman listed it as one of the "Top 20 Political Songs".

The 1964 release of the song as a Columbia Records Hall of Fame series 45 single, 13-33088, by Pete Seeger was inducted into the Grammy Hall of Fame in 2002 in the Folk category.

Composition
Seeger found inspiration for the song in October 1955 while he was on a plane bound for a concert at Oberlin College, one of the few venues which would hire him during the McCarthy era. Leafing through his notebook he saw the passage, "Where are the flowers, the girls have plucked them. Where are the girls, they've all taken husbands. Where are the men, they're all in the army." These lines were taken from the traditional Cossack folk-song "Koloda-Duda", referenced in the Mikhail Sholokhov novel And Quiet Flows the Don (1934), which Seeger had read "at least a year or two before". In a 2013 interview, Seeger explained that he borrowed the melody from an Irish lumberjack song with the words 'Johnson says he'll load more hay.' He simply slowed the tune and incorporated the lines into it.

Seeger created a song which was subsequently published in Sing Out in 1962. He recorded a version with three verses on The Rainbow Quest album (Folkways LP FA 2454) released in July 1960. Later, Joe Hickerson added two more verses with a recapitulation of the first in May 1960 in Bloomington, Indiana.

In 2010, the New Statesman listed it as one of the "Top 20 Political Songs".

The song appeared on the compilation album Pete Seeger's Greatest Hits (1967) released by Columbia Records as CS 9416.

Pete Seeger's recording from the Columbia album The Bitter and the Sweet (November 1962), CL 1916, produced by John H. Hammond was also released as a Columbia Hall of Fame 45 single as 13-33088 backed by "Little Boxes" in August, 1965.

Versions

1961−1964
The Kingston Trio recorded the song in 1961. Believing it to be a traditional song, they claimed authorship, although upon notice from Seeger they had their name removed and credited Seeger and Hickerson. Seeger acknowledged their success with this song. Their single, with "O Ken Karanga" as the A-side and the hit "Where Have All The Flowers Gone?" the B-side, reached No. 21 in the 1962 Billboard Hot 100 chart and No. 4 on the Easy Listening chart.
The Landsmen released the song in 1961 as a 45 rpm single on Arvee.
Peter, Paul and Mary included the song on their eponymous debut album (which spent five weeks as the No. 1 album in the United States) in 1962.
Marlene Dietrich performed the song in English, French, and German.  The song was first performed in French (as "Qui peut dire où vont les fleurs?") by Dietrich in 1962 at a UNICEF concert. She also recorded the song in English and in German, the latter titled "Sag' mir, wo die Blumen sind", with lyrics translated by Max Colpet.  She performed the German version on a tour of Israel, where she was warmly received; she was the first performer to break the taboo of publicly using the German language in Israel since WWII. Her version peaked No. 20 in German charts.
Dalida (1933−1987), an Italian-French singer, also recorded the song in French as "Que sont devenues les fleurs?", adapted by Guy Béart in 1962 (Les Années Barclay, vol. 5, 1962).
The Folkswingers recorded an instrumental version of the song for their second album 12 String Guitar! Vol. 2 (1963).
Jaap Fischer recorded the song in Dutch as "Zeg me waar de bloemen zijn" (single, B side of "Jan Soldaat", 1963).
Conny van den Bos (1937−2002) recorded the song in Dutch "Waar zijn al die bloemen toch?", released 1963.
The Searchers released their version on the album Meet The Searchers, released in June 1963.
The Springfields featuring Dusty Springfield released a version in German in 1963.
Bobby Darin (1936−1973) recorded the song on the Golden Folk Hits album on Capitol, 2007, which was released in November 1963.
Eddy Arnold and The Needmore Creek Singers recorded the song on October 9, 1963, and released it on the Folk Song Book album released in January 1964.
Erzsi Kovács (1928−2014), a Hungarian pop singer, recorded a version in Hungarian in 1964.
Heli Lääts (1932−2018), an Estonian concert singer, recorded a version in Estonian in 1964, with the title "Kuhu küll kõik lilled jäid?"
Vera Lynn (1917−2020) recorded the song as the eleventh cut on her 1964 album "Among My Souvenirs".
The Brothers Four recorded the song on their 1964 LP "More Big Folk Hits", Columbia Records, CL-2213.
The Four Seasons recorded the song on their 1964 Philips album Born to Wander, PHM 200 129.
Lars Lönndahl recorded the song in 1964 with Swedish lyrics Inga blommor finns det mer, translated in 1962 by Beppe Wolgers.

1965−1969
Joan Baez included the German version (Sagt Mir wo die Blumen sind) on her 1965 album Farewell Angelina.
Johnny Rivers had a 1965 U.S. top 40 hit with a folk rock version, reaching No. 26 on the Billboard Hot 100 and No. 9 in Canada.
Grady Martin released an instrumental version in 1965 on his Instrumentally Yours album.
Harry Belafonte has made one recording of it at a benefit concert in Stockholm, Sweden, 1966 on the album BEL-1.
Walter Jackson recorded a R&B version in Chicago for Okeh Records in 1967.
Lester Flatt and Earl Scruggs included the song on their 1968 album Changin' Times.
Jazz guitarist Wes Montgomery recorded an instrumental version in his trademark style on the 1968 LP Road Song.
The Chambers Brothers recorded the song for their 1968 album A New Time – A New Day.
The Peddlers recorded a studio version of the song for their 1969 album Birthday.
In 1969, Rufus Harley recorded a jazz instrumental version on his trademark bagpipes, but the track was never commercially released until it was included in his posthumously released limited edition collection Courage – The Atlantic Recordings in 2006.

1970−1979
Roy Orbison recorded a version of the song which appears on the album The Connoisseur's Orbison (1970). 
American country singer Bill Anderson recorded the song on his December, 1970 album Where Have All Our Heroes Gone, and on his eponymous 1971 album.
American R&B band Earth, Wind & Fire covered the song on the 1972 album Last Days and Time.
Richie Havens recorded the song in 1972.
Alberto Y Lost Trios Paranoias, an English comedy rock band, included a version on their 1978 album Skite.
The Hi-Marks, a popular 1970s group in New Zealand, recorded a version on their first album Showtime Spectacular (1979).

1980−1989
Yellow Magic Orchestra recorded the song in 1980 and released it in the 1999 compilation album "YMO GO HOME!"
Hannes Wader recorded a German version as the final track for his 1982 album Daß nichts bleibt wie es war.
City, a then-East German rock band formed in East Berlin in 1972, recorded a German-language version in their 1983 album Unter der Haut.
Bernie Sanders covered the song on his 1987 album We Shall Overcome.

1990−1999
Croatian folk band Zlatni Dukati performed a version of the song entitled "Iznad polja makova" ("Above the fields of poppy") during the Croatian War of Independence (1991−1995), and recorded the song in their 1991 album U Meni Hrvatska.
 Serbian actor Dragan Maksimović performed a part of this song in the movie Mi nismo anđeli ("We are not Angels") recorded in 1992 in Yugoslavia.
 British Folk-Rock group The Tansads included a version on their 1995 live album Drag Down The Moon.
Scottish-Nigerian singer-songwriter Nicolette covered the song on her 1996 album Let No-One Live Rent Free in Your Head.
Kabir Suman translated the song to Bengali (Kothaye Gelo Tara). Suman and Seeger performed the English and Bengali versions one after the other twice during Suman and Seeger's Tour of Kolkata in 1996.
A Russian version of the song was recorded in 1998 by Oleg Nesterov, a lead singer of Megapolis, and later performed in duet with Masha Makarova (of the rock band Masha i Medvedi) in a music video.
 Irish folk band The Fureys recorded it for their albums Twenty One Years On (1999) and The Times They Are a Changing (2014)

2000−2009
A Czech-language version of the song ("Řekni, kde ty kytky jsou") was also created and recorded by several popular artists, such as Judita Čeřovská, or Marta Kubišová. Čeřovská's version was one of the OST songs of the 2001 Czech film Rebelové.
A Polish-language version was sung by Sława Przybylska (Polish title: "Gdzie są kwiaty z tamtych lat?"). The song was released on the 2001 compilation album Pamiętasz Była Jesień.
Adhunik Bengali singer Anjan Dutt covered the song in his 2001 album Rawng Pencil. 
Green Day thematically and lyrically mimic the song on the track Letterbomb from the 2004 album American Idiot.
Olivia Newton-John recorded the song on her 2004 album Indigo: Women of Song.
Country singer Dolly Parton has also recorded a rendition of the song, on her 2005 album Those Were the Days.
Chris de Burgh has recorded a version which is featured on his 2008 album Footsteps.
The song was sung at the funeral of Harry Patch, the last British soldier of the First World War, in Wells Cathedral on August 9, 2009.
A piano version of the song by Scottish pop singer and songwriter Jimmy Somerville appears on his 2009 album Suddenly Last Summer.
 Classical guitarist Sharon Isbin recorded an instrumental version in her 2009 album Journey to the New World.

2010−2019
Danish-German songwriter and entrepreneur Kirsten Hasberg, of Kassel, Germany, recorded a parody entitled Sag, die Energiewende, wo ist sie geblieben? about the German transition to renewable energies and "energy democracy" (2012).
Lara Veronin, a Russian-Taiwanese-American singer, recorded a version for the 2012 Taiwanese drama Alice in Wonder City.
 German Avant-garde group Einstürzende Neubauten recorded a German version of the song for their 2014 album Lament.
The Armistice Pals recorded a version in 2014 that was released as a commemoration of the 100th Anniversary of World War One, and as a tribute to Pete Seeger, who had died earlier that year. The voice of Pete Seeger is heard in the recording along with that of his half-sister Peggy Seeger.

2020−
 Canadian singer-songwriter Pierre Lapointe recorded the German version (Sag mir wo die Blumen sind) for his 2022 album L'heure mauve.
 Russian actress and director Renata Litvinova performed a recitative on Russian (Когда же Вы наконец поймёте?) over Marlene Dietrich's singing as a background which can be an act against the Russian invasion of Ukraine (2022).
 Greek singer-songwriter Vasiliki Nika recorded the Greek version (Τα λουλούδια χάθηκαν). The video directed by Alexandros N. V. refers to the Kalavryta massacre.

Foreign-language titles

Grammy Hall of Fame
Pete Seeger's recording of his composition was inducted into the Grammy Hall of Fame, which is a special Grammy award established in 1973 to honor recordings that are at least 25 years old and that have "qualitative or historical significance."

See also
 List of anti-war songs

References

Bibliography
 

American folk songs
Anti-war songs
1955 songs
1962 singles
Pete Seeger songs
1965 singles
Johnny Rivers songs
The Searchers (band) songs
The Kingston Trio songs
Songs about flowers
Songs written by Pete Seeger
Peter, Paul and Mary songs
Marlene Dietrich songs